Charles Strong (26 September 1844 – 12 February 1942) was a Scottish-born Australian preacher and first minister of the Australian Church.

Early life
Strong was the third son of the Rev. David Strong and Margaret Paterson, née Roxburgh, and was born at Dailly, Ayrshire, Scotland. Strong was educated at the Ayr Academy, Glasgow Academy, and in Arts and Divinity at the University of Glasgow 1859–67 (hon. LL.D., 1887). John Caird had become Professor of Divinity in 1863 and was the principal influence on Strong. Caird was known as an attractive preacher but his theology was much influenced by G.W.H. Hegel, the German idealist philosopher. After some months experience as a private tutor 1867, Strong was licensed as a preacher on 2 October 1867 and became an assistant at Dalmellington, Ayrshire. On 7 October 1868 he was ordained to the Old North Kirk at Greenock which was then a chapel under the oversight of the Old West Kirk. On 16 March 1871 he was inducted to Anderston Parish Church in Glasgow where Professor Caird also attended. 
In 1872 Strong married Janet Julia Fullarton (daughter of Archibald Fairrie Denniston); they had three daughters and five sons together.

Australia
In May 1875 Strong was chosen as pastor for the Scots' Church, Collins Street Melbourne, replacing Irving Hetherington. Strong and his family arrived on 23 August 1875.

Strong's ministry was a success and he became known as one of the leading preachers in Melbourne. He emphasised practical Christianity. The Scots' Church Convalescents' Aid Society was formed in 1879, followed by the Scots' Church District Association in 1881. Its major work was the care of neglected children (continued today as Kildonan Uniting Care). He was also a pacifist.

Strong's liberal views on theological matters, however, led to suspicion by some in the Presbyterian Church. In 1880 attention was called in the presbytery to a paper submitted by Strong titled "The Atonement" which appeared in the Victorian Review; a committee appointed to investigate the article reported that some passages required explanation. The charges appeared to some to have been tenuous, one of his principal accusers said of one passage that "the words were perfectly harmless in themselves but conveyed an impression of unsoundness to his mind". By most they were seen as inadequate given his obligation to assert, maintain and defend the doctrine of the Presbyterian Church. Of course Strong had come from a relatively liberal Church of Scotland to a church that was the result of a union in 1859 including Free Church of Scotland and United Presbyterian ministers. What might have passed in Scotland without great upheaval was likely to take a different turn in Victoria, whose Presbyterian Assembly was chaired by hard-line fundamentalist Moderator John Gardner.

With continuing friction in the presbytery, Strong tendered his resignation on 8 August 1881; however he agreed to take six months leave instead at the request of church officers and the congregation. Strong left his family in Melbourne and visited Scotland from March to October 1882 after a speech by a Scots Church elder, J. C. Stewart, reignited attacks on him.

On Strong's return to Melbourne he was admonished by the presbytery for supporting the opening of the Public Library and Art Gallery on Sundays. With George Selth Coppin in 1883, Strong promoted lodging-houses.

In August 1883 Strong was chairman at a meeting of the Scots' Church Literary Association when Judge Higinbotham gave a lecture on 'Science and Religion', and Strong was attacked again. At the meeting Strong dissociated himself front some of Higinbotham's statements, and later on replied to them in a sermon. Strong was, however, charged with promulgating unsound and heretical doctrine and he resigned from the Presbyterian Church of Victoria, and as minister of the Scots' Church, although by the law of the church these could not be accepted while charges were pending.

On 14 November 1883 a large number of his friends met at the Melbourne Town Hall to express their sympathy with Strong and to present him with a cheque for £3000 (at least $500,000 in today's values). At 9 pm. that evening he received a summons from the Presbyterian assembly to attend a meeting by 11 pm. and disavow all complicity with the doctrines of the lecture and declare his faith in the true deity of the Lord Jesus Christ, the propitiatory character of his death and the real resurrection of his body from the dead. Strong, who was on the eve of his departure to Europe declined to attend, and the assembly passed a motion the day after his departure declaring him no longer a minister of the Presbyterian Church of Victoria, by a vote of 136 to 6. Strong regarded the assembly's ...proceedings as unconstitutional and illegal.

Strong returned to Melbourne in October 1884; in November 1885 the Australian Church was founded and he was invited become its first minister. A large church was built in Flinders Street, Melbourne, and for several years Strong had a congregation of about 1,000, but was in trouble in the 1890s. Strong accepted William Edward Addis, a former Glasgow classmate, as assistant minister in 1888. However, Strong and Addis had different views on theology, politics, economics and society; Addis did not seek reappointment and left Australia early in 1893.
For various reasons, including difficulties with his assistants, the economic situation and Strong's sympathy for the manual workers, the richer members of his congregation dropped away and in 1922 a smaller church was built in Russell Street. Strong ministered there to the end of his life, in his last years accepting no salary.

Strong founded the first crèche in Australia at Collingwood, one of the poorer suburbs of Melbourne, was an earnest supporter of the Anti-Sweating League, the Criminology Society, the Peace Society, and other organisations for social reform. Strong was unselfish; when an admirer left him £250 he immediately sent it to Dr Maloney for his milk for children fund.

Late life and legacy
Still active in mind and body, Strong died after a fall at Lorne, Victoria, on 12 February 1942, aged 97. Strong was survived by five sons and two daughters.

Strong's published works included Unsectarian Services for Use in Schools and Families (1888), Church Worship (1892), Christianity Re-interpreted and other Sermons (1894), and various separate addresses and sermons. From 1887 until his death Strong edited a monthly periodical known variously as Our Good Words (1887–89), The Australian Herald (1889–1908) and The Commonweal (1908–42). Strong received the degree of Doctor of Divinity from the University of Glasgow for his thesis upon the "Doctrine of the Atonement". Strong always claimed "that he was neither an iconoclast nor an innovator. Changes were taking place in modern thought and if he prepared his people for them it was that they might be strengthened in the faith".

External links
 Rev. Charles Strong (1844–1942) Gravesite at Brighton General Cemetery (Vic)

References

C.R.Badger, Charles Strong and the Australian Church (Charles Strong Memorial Trust 1971)
Scots' Church, Reports and Financial Statements of The Scots' Church 1877–1883
Hew Scott (ed), Fasti Ecclesiae Scoticanae: The Succession of Ministers in the Church of Scotland, Vol 3 (Edinburgh 1920)
R.S.Ward, The Bush Still Burns: The Presbyterian and Reformed Faith in Australia 1788–1988 (Melbourne 1989)

1844 births
1942 deaths
Australian Protestant ministers and clergy
Calvinist pacifists
Australian people of Scottish descent
People educated at Ayr Academy
People educated at the Glasgow Academy
Alumni of the University of Glasgow